Vezin-le-Coquet (Gallo: Bezein) is a commune in the Ille-et-Vilaine department of Brittany in northwestern France.

A men's prison, the Centre Penitentiaire pour Hommes de Vezin (operational since March 2010), is located within the commune.

Population
Inhabitants of Vezin-le-Coquet are called Vezinois in French.

See also
Communes of the Ille-et-Vilaine department

References

External links

Official website Vezin-le-Coquet 
Mayors of Ille-et-Vilaine Association 

Communes of Ille-et-Vilaine